Conon (5th-4th c. BCE) was an Athenian general at the end of the Peloponnesian War.

Conon or Konon may also refer to:

People

Greek name
 Conon of Samos (c. 280 BCE–c. 220 BCE), Greek astronomer and mathematician
 Conon of Tarsus, 6th-century bishop and leader of the heretical Tritheist movement
 Conon (mythographer), 1st-century BCE Greece
 Conon (general under Justinian I), Byzantine general commanding during the Siege of Naples (542–43)
 Pope Conon (died 687)
 Leo III the Isaurian (c. 685–741), born Konon; Byzantine Emperor

Germanic name
 Conon, Count of Montaigu (died 1106), Lotharingian nobleman and military leader of the First Crusade
 Conon, Count of Montaigu and Duras (fl. 1189)
 Conon de Béthune (c. 1150–1219), French crusader and "trouvère"
 Hans Conon von der Gabelentz (1807–1874), German minister and linguist

Saints
By chronological order of their presumed death year

Catholic and Orthodox saints
 Conon of Isauria, 2nd-century miracle worker and martyr from Isauria; feast day 5 March
 Conon of Perga or Conon the Gardener (died c. 250), from Perga in Asia Minor

  or Conon of Penthucla/of the Jordan (died ca. 555)
 Conon of Rome, martyr, drowned at sea; feast day 5 June
 Conon and Conon (died 275), 3rd-century saint
 Conon of Naso (1139-1236), Italian abbot and saint; feast day 27 March

Places
 Conon, Lutwyche, a heritage-listed house in Brisbane, Queensland, Australia
 Conon Bridge, a village in the Highland region of Scotland
 River Conon, a river in the Highlands of Scotland

Astronomy
 Conon (crater), a lunar crater
 12153 Conon, an asteroid

See also
 Conan (disambiguation)
 Connan, a surname
 Konan (disambiguation)